Monza railway station is the main station serving the city and comune of Monza, in the region of Lombardy, northern Italy.

Opened in 1840 under the Habsburg monarchy, the station forms part of the Milan–Chiasso railway, and is a junction station for two secondary lines, the Lecco–Milan railway and the Monza–Molteno–Lecco railway.  It is also the main railway junction of the Brianza geographical area, which encompasses the province of Monza and Brianza, Province of Lecco, Province of Como and part of the Province of Milan.

The station is currently managed by Rete Ferroviaria Italiana (RFI).  However, the commercial area of the passenger building is managed by Centostazioni. Both companies are subsidiaries of Ferrovie dello Stato Italiane (FS), Italy's state-owned rail company.

Train services are operated by the Lombard railway company Trenord.

Location
Monza railway station is located on Via Enrico Arosio, at the southern edge of the city centre.

History
The station was officially opened on 17 August 1840, as the terminus of the Milan–Monza railway, which was the first railway built in Lombardy and the second in Italy, after the Naples–Portici railway.  Operations commenced the following day, 18 August 1840.  In July 1849, that line was extended to Camnago-Lentate, on its way to becoming the Milan–Chiasso railway.

On 27 December 1873, Monza became a junction station, upon the opening of the final section of the Lecco–Milan railway, between Carnate-Usmate and Monza.

The original passenger building was replaced with the present one in 1884, when the station was moved to a new location. In 1901, the original passenger building was demolished to facilitate the construction of the Via Turati bridge.

On 19 October 1911, Monza also became the terminus of another secondary line, the Monza–Molteno–Lecco railway.

Features

The station yard consists of seven tracks: 1 and 2 for Chiasso, 3 previously shared between the Chiasso–Milan and Lecco–Milan railways, 4 and 5 for Tirano (RFI), and 6 (as the main platform) and 7 (as the overtaking platform) for the Lecco and Molteno lines.

The station also has a freight terminal that serves, amongst other things, the nearby storage area of the former Lombard Petroli, at Villasanta.

Train services
The station has about seven million passenger movements each year. It is served by the following services:

Eurocity services (EC) Zürich - Arth-Goldau - Bellinzona - Chiasso - Milan
Eurocity services (EC) Basel - Luzern - Arth-Goldau - Bellinzona - Chiasso - Milan
Regional services (Treno regionale) Lecco - Molteno - Monza - Milan
Regional services (Treno regionale) Lecco - Calolziocorte - Carnate - Monza - Milan
Regional services (Treno regionale) Bergamo - Carnate - Monza - Milan
Regional services (Treno regionale) Saronno - Seregno - Monza - Milan - Albairate
Regional services (Treno regionale) Chiasso - Como - Seregno - Monza - Milan

Interchange
The station is connected with the Milan suburban railway network by Lines S7, S8, S9, and S11.  It also has a bus terminal for local buses.

See also

History of rail transport in Italy
List of railway stations in Lombardy
Rail transport in Italy
Railway stations in Italy

References

External links

Railway Station
Railway stations in Lombardy
Milan S Lines stations
Railway stations in Italy opened in 1840